Marvin Kenneth Epp (May 11, 1939 – February 20, 2022) was a Canadian politician.

Epp was a member of the Conservative Party of Canada in the House of Commons of Canada, representing the riding of Edmonton—Sherwood Park since its creation in June 2004. He was previously the MP for Elk Island from 1993 to 2004. He has also been a member of the Canadian Alliance (2000-2003) and the Reform Party of Canada (1993-2000). Epp was a former mathematics instructor at the Northern Alberta Institute of Technology in Edmonton.

Epp did not run in the 2008 federal election, having announced his intention to retire on August 17, 2006.

Epp died on February 20, 2022, at the age of 82.

References

External links
 How'd They Vote?: Ken Epp's voting history and quotes
 

1939 births
2022 deaths
21st-century Canadian politicians
Canadian Alliance MPs
Conservative Party of Canada MPs
Members of the House of Commons of Canada from Alberta
People from Sherwood Park
People from Swift Current
Reform Party of Canada MPs